Television ratings in Australia are used to determine the size and composition of audiences across Australian broadcast and subscription television, primarily for the purpose of informing advertisers what programming is popular with the audience they are attempting to sell their product or service to.

Ratings are monitored year-round, however, viewership figures are only officially counted for 40 weeks during the year, excluding a two-week break during Easter and ten weeks over summer. Thus, the majority of locally produced programming and popular international shows on commercial networks are shown during the rating period.

A 2016 report found that commercial television in Australia reaches 85.1% of the population aged over 13 years old (down from 93.1% in 2008) with viewership decreasing fastest in viewers aged under 50. The decline in free-to-air television audiences of recent years has been attributed to a tougher and more competitive environment brought about by video on demand and streaming services.

History
Until 1991, AGB McNair provided television ratings data, covering only homes in Sydney and Melbourne. From 1991 until 2000, 'Nielsen Media Research Australia' was the company that measured television ratings, introducing People meters for the first time. From 2001 onwards, OzTAM and Regional TAM took over. OzTAM is wholly owned by the three commercial broadcasters (Seven Network, Nine Network and Network Ten), while Regional TAM is owned by a number of regional broadcasters, however both operate independently.

In total, OzTAM measures ratings from 3,500 homes, with 950 homes in Sydney, 900 in Melbourne, 650 in Brisbane and 500 each in Adelaide and Perth, with these ratings commonly referred to as 'five city metro ratings'. A further 2,000 homes outside these five cities are measured by Regional TAM, and an additional 1,200 homes monitor viewing of subscription television in Australia. Nielsen are contracted to provide the audience measurement services to both OzTAM and Regional TAM having previously operated their own measurement service. In 2017, the metropolitan homes measured will increase to 5,250.

From 27 December 2009, OzTAM and Regional TAM introduced time shift ratings, measuring viewers who watch a program within seven days of its first broadcast. Ratings reports were subsequently broken out into two parts:
Overnight ratings - preliminary figures combining real-time viewing and 'as live' viewing (timeshifted and watched the same day of broadcast), which are released the following calendar day at 9 am AEST.
Consolidated ratings - final figures combining overnight ratings and time-shifted viewing watched within 7 days of initial broadcast, which are released the afternoon of the following week.

In October 2014, Australia became the third country to introduce Nielsen Twitter TV ratings, measuring reach and activity of television related discussions on the social media platform.

From 3 April 2016, OzTAM began releasing timeshift viewing data for programs watched up to 28 days after broadcast, noting that genres such as dramas, mini-series and films could add up to 20% of their audience with the new data, even though viewing between 8 and 28 days after initial broadcast accounted for only 1.8% of total television viewing.

Measurements
In Australian media, the most common ratings metric reported publicly is total viewers of a program from all age groups. However, advertisers typically prefer the viewership of demographic ranges based on the type of viewers they are seeking to promote their product to. The three common aged-based demographic groups, known as the 'key demographics,' include people aged 16 to 39, 18 to 49 and 25 to 54.

In advertising and media, the reporting of ratings has historically been confined to what is known as '5 city metro,' which only includes viewership of the OzTAM panels in the five largest cities (Sydney, Melbourne, Brisbane, Adelaide, and Perth). Since the 2010s, it has become more common for television networks to publicly spruik 'national ratings' which combine the 5 city metro audience with ratings from Regional TAM.

Ratings performance
In 1989, for the first time since 1978, the Seven Network overtook its rivals Nine Network and Network 10 in terms of average viewers and have remained ahead of Nine and Ten every year until 1994, where due to lower ratings than expected, and a launch of new programs not performing as hoped, the Nine Network defeated Seven Network and regained the title as the highest rating television network in Australia, with the latter relegated back to second highest for the first time in twelve years. In 1990, for the first time since OzTAM began, the Seven Network won all forty weeks of the official ratings period, and, as of 1994, has won the last five years of ratings consecutively throughout the late 1980s and early 1990:.

From 1994 up until 2004, the Nine Network had generally been the ratings leader in Australia, typically followed by the Seven Network and Network Ten respectively. While Network Ten generally rates lower in total viewers, it has traditionally been the market leader for younger viewers. The two national broadcasters, ABC TV and SBS One, typically attract fewer viewers than the three commercial networks due to their various public service obligations.

In 2005, for the first time since 2000, the late 1980s and early 1990s and 1978, the Seven Network overtook its rival Nine Network in terms of average viewers and have remained ahead of Nine and Ten every year until 2019, where due to lower ratings than expected, and a launch of new programs not performing as hoped, the Nine Network defeated Seven Network and regained the title as the highest rating television network in Australia, with the latter relegated back to second highest for the first time in twelve years. In 2011, for the first time since OzTAM began, the Seven Network won all forty weeks of the official ratings period, and, as of 2017, has won the last thirteen years of ratings consecutively.

As of 2016, FOX8 is the most viewed subscription channel on the Foxtel platform.

Top-rated programs

The highest-rated programs on Australian television typically include sporting events, reality shows and locally produced scripted programs. They do not factor in digital streaming services.

*Largest event so far this year.

Yearly shares
The following table lists the average shares for the survey period of the calendar year, for total viewers in the 5 metropolitan cities during primetime between 6pm and midnight. Prior to 2010, shares were not broken out into a network's different multi-channels.

See also

 Television in Australia
 Audience measurement
 OzTAM
 Nielsen Media Research

References